Regions Bank building can refer to a number of buildings currently, formerly, or unofficially named for Regions Bank:

100 North Tampa, previously the Regions Building, in Tampa, Florida
Regions Bank Building (Mobile) in Mobile, Alabama
Regions Center (Birmingham) in Birmingham, Alabama. Corporate Headquarters
Regions Center (Little Rock) in Little Rock, Arkansas
Regions-Harbert Plaza in Birmingham, Alabama
Regions Plaza (Atlanta, Georgia)
Regions Plaza (Jackson, Mississippi)
Regions Tower in Shreveport, Louisiana.
Regions Tower in Indianapolis, Indiana
One Nashville Place in Nashville, Tennessee
Regions Bank Building (Jackson, Mississippi) in Jackson, Mississippi.
Regions 615 in Charlotte, North Carolina 
Regions Bank Building in Orlando, Florida

Regions Financial Corporation